The Oerlikon GAI-BO1 is a Swiss designed and built light anti-aircraft gun which is mounted on a two-wheeled carriage with three folding outriggers.  Due to its light weight and ability to be broken down into small loads it can also be mounted on ships and vehicles.

Description
The GAI-BO1 consists of a KAB 20 × 128 mm auto-cannon mounted on a folding platform. The gun has no power assistance with elevation of the counter-balanced barrel controlled by a hand-wheel and traverse is by foot. Due to its lack of power assistance it is unable to engage fast moving aerial targets, although it is still useful for engaging light observation aircraft and helicopters. Three different sized magazines 8-round, 20-round and 50-rounds are available. There is a simple mechanical computing sight with 1x magnification for aerial targets and a 3.5x scope for engaging ground targets.

References

External links
 http://www.pmulcahy.com/autocannons/swiss_autocannons.html
 https://www.taringa.net/posts/imagenes/16750740/Canon-antiaereo-Oerlikon-GAI-BO1-20mm.html

20 mm artillery
Autocannon
Oerlikon-Contraves